Carool is a town located in the Tweed Shire in north-eastern New South Wales, Australia.

Demographics

The median age of the Carool population was 42 years, 5 years above the national median of 37.

72.5% of people living in Carool were born in Australia. The other top responses for country of birth were New Zealand 2%, Scotland 1.3%, England 1.1%, Germany 0.7%, Barbados 0.7%.

79.6% of people spoke only English at home; the next most common languages were 1.1% Polish, 1.1% German.

References 

Suburbs of Tweed Heads, New South Wales